The Mirror Maker is a collection of stories and essays by  Italian author Primo Levi originally published in the Italian newspaper La Stampa.

Stories
"The Thaw"
"The Interview"
"They Were Made to Be Together"
"The Great Mutation"
"The Two Flags"
"Five Intimate Interviews"
"The Mirror Maker"
"Through the Walls"
"The Ant's Wedding"
"Force Majeure"
"A Mystery in the Lager"
"Time Checkmated"
"The Tommy-Gun under the Bed"

Essays
"A Valley"
"The Commander of Auschwitz"
"The Moon and Man"
"Sic!"
"Our Dreams"
"The Struggle for Life"
"Spears Become Shields"
"Translating Kafka"
"Rhyming on the Counterattack"
"Dear Horace"
"Bacteria Roulette"
"Among the Peaks of Manhattan"
"The Wine of the Borgias"
"Reproducing Miracles"
"The Man Who Flies"
"About Gossip"
"Jack London's Buck"
"Adam's Clay"
"The Spider's Secret"
"The Dispute among German Historians"
"Defiance in the Ghetto"
"Hatching the Cobra"

1986 short story collections
Short story collections by Primo Levi
Essay collections by Primo Levi
Works originally published in Italian newspapers
Schocken Books books